Solomon Jabason (born 12 December 1991) is a Nigerian football midfielder.

References

1991 births
Living people
Nigerian footballers
Nigeria international footballers
Wikki Tourists F.C. players
Akwa United F.C. players
Rangers International F.C. players
Al-Ahly SC (Benghazi) players
Al-Merrikh SC players
Al-Hilal Club (Omdurman) players
Association football midfielders
Nigerian expatriate footballers
Expatriate footballers in Libya
Nigerian expatriate sportspeople in Libya
Expatriate footballers in Sudan
Nigerian expatriate sportspeople in Sudan
Libyan Premier League players